Accolti is a Tuscan family, of the 15th and 16th centuries, appearing in Arezzo around 1300 and famous for their learning. Members were
 Benedetto Accolti the Elder (1415–1466)
 Benedetto Accolti the Younger (1497–1549), Italian cardinal, son of Michele Accolti, nephew of Pietro Accolti
 Francesco Accolti (c. 1416-c. 1488)
 Pietro Accolti  (1455–1532)
 Bernardo Accolti (1465-c. 1536)

Citations

References 

Italian noble families
15th-century Italian nobility
16th-century Italian nobility
History of Arezzo